Janežovci is a settlement in the Municipality of Destrnik in northeastern Slovenia. It lies in the valley of Rogoznica Creek, a left tributary of the Drava River. The area is part of the traditional region of Styria. The municipality is now included in the Drava Statistical Region.

References

External links
Janežovci on Geopedia

Populated places in the Municipality of Destrnik